Lady Laura Elizabeth Ridding born  Laura Elizabeth Palmer (26 March 1849 – 22 May 1939) was a British biographer, suffragist and philanthropist.

Life
Ridding was born in Harley Street. Her father, Roundell Palmer, 1st Earl of Selborne, had married Lady Laura, daughter of William Waldegrave, 8th Earl Waldegrave, in 1848. They had five children and she was their eldest.

In 1876 she married George Ridding, the first bishop of Southwell, and became known as Lady Laura Ridding.

In 1885 she founded the National Union of Women Workers at a conference in Nottingham that she had organised. She founded the organisation with the writer Louise Creighton and the administrator Emily Janes. Although it was called a union its purpose was to co-ordinate the voluntary efforts of women across Great Britain. It said that it would "promote sympathy of thought and purpose among the women of Great Britain and Ireland" Creighton became the first President and in time Ridding would also serve.

Ridding wrote five biographies, the first three volumes were for her husband. She then wrote a biography of her nephew Robert Palmer and a fifth about her sister Laura Palmer.

Ridding moved to the rectory in Wonston in 1904 and died there in 1939.

Works
 George Ridding, schoolmaster and bishop 
 43rd head of Winchester, 1866–1884
 first bishop of Southwell, 1884–1904 (1908)
 The Life of Robert Palmer, 1888–1916 (1921)

References 

1849 births
1939 deaths
People from Marylebone
English biographers
British suffragists
Writers from London
Presidents of the National Council of Women of Great Britain
Daughters of British earls
Laura
19th-century English women
19th-century English people
20th-century English women
20th-century English people
19th-century women writers
20th-century women writers
English women writers
English women activists
English women philanthropists
19th-century British philanthropists
20th-century British philanthropists
Women biographers
Philanthropists from London
20th-century women philanthropists
19th-century women philanthropists